This is a list of the National Register of Historic Places listings in Dallas County, Texas.

This is intended to be a complete list of properties and districts listed on the National Register of Historic Places in Dallas County, Texas. There are 34 districts, 110 individual properties, and three former properties listed on the National Register in the county. Two districts and one individually listed property are also National Historic Landmarks. Four individually listed properties are State Antiquities Landmarks with five districts containing several more. Twenty-two individual properties are Recorded Texas Historic Landmarks while seven districts host multiple additional RTHLs.

Current listings

The locations of National Register properties and districts may be seen in a mapping service provided.

|}

Former listings

|}

See also

National Register of Historic Places listings in Texas
Recorded Texas Historic Landmarks in Dallas County

References

External links

 
Dallas